Ramdhura is a village in Kalimpong II CD block in the Kalimpong Sadar subdivision of the Kalimpong district in the state of West Bengal, India.

Etymology
The name Ramdhura is a combination of Ram (of Ramayana) and Dhura, which means village.

Geography

Location
Ramdhura is located at

Area overview
The map alongside shows the Kalimpong Sadar subdivision of Kalimpong district. This region is characterized by abruptly rising hills and numerous small streams. It is a predominantly rural area with 77.67% of the population living in rural areas and only 22.23% living in the urban areas. While Kalimpong is the only municipality, Dungra is the sole census town in the entire area. The economy is agro-based and there are 6 tea gardens in the Gorubathan CD block. In 2011, Kalimpong subdivision had a literacy rate of 81.85%, comparable with the highest levels of literacy in the districts of the state. While the first degree college in the subdivision was established at Kalimpong in 1962 the entire subdivision (and now the entire district), other than the head-quarters, had to wait till as late as 2015 (more than half a century) to have their first degree colleges at Pedong and Gorubathan.

Note: The map alongside presents some of the notable locations in the subdivision. All places marked in the map are linked in the larger full screen map.

The place
It is situated at an elevation of 5000 ft and at a distance of around 15 kilometers from Delo. The village is situated at a moderate height, and forests of pine and other hilly trees offer absolute tranquility.

Ramdhura has a fabulous panoramic view. A mesmerizing sunrise with its changing colours over Mt. Kanchenjunga is the main attraction. But the Teesta river, flowing beneath a majestic green valley, the pine forests, the Cinchona Plantation and flocks of colourful birds and butterflies also attract tourists. From Ramdhura,  tourists can visit the nearby tourist interest points of Kalimpong, Pedong and Algarah like Durpin dara, Delo hill, Pedong Monastery. Icche Gaon, Sillery Gaon and its surroundings area like Ramitey Dara, Damsang Fort and Tinchuley view point are also interesting places.

Ramdhura has a very moderate weather and can be visited throughout the year but to get a clear view of Mount Kanchenjunga, it is better to avoid the monsoon.

Transportation
The nearest railway station  is New Jalpaiguri Railway station (NJP) which is 86 km away and the nearest airport is Bagdogra Airport which is 89 km from Ramdhura. There is no direct bus service for Ramdhura. Visitors can take a bus from NJP to Kalimpong and from Kalimpong they need to hire a cab for Ramdhura. Otherwise one can book a cab up to Ramdhura from NJP station.

References

Villages in Kalimpong district